Edwin Henry Taylor Moulton (born 18 April 1999) is an English cricketer. He made his first-class debut on 1 August 2020, for Lancashire in the 2020 Bob Willis Trophy. Moulton signed for Lancashire ahead of the 2020 season, after playing for Chorley Cricket Club and Lancashire's second XI. In September 2021, Moulton was signed on loan to Derbyshire for the rest of the season. In November 2021, he was released by Lancashire.

References

External links
 

1999 births
Living people
Cricketers from Preston, Lancashire
Derbyshire cricketers
English cricketers
Lancashire cricketers